Chuck Deardorf (April 3, 1954 – October 9, 2022) was an American musician.  He was best known for playing double bass and bass guitar with the Deardorf Peterson Group.  He also headed the jazz department at the Cornish College of the Arts.

Early life
Deardorf was born on April 3, 1954, and grew up in the Dayton metropolitan area.  He started playing the double bass when he was fifteen.  During his senior year of high school, he relocated to the West Coast and attended Central Kitsap High School.  He then studied at the Evergreen State College, before playing at Seattle jazz clubs such as Parnell's and Dimitriou's Jazz Alley.  There, he served as a backing musician to Zoot Sims, Monty Alexander, and Kenny Barron, among others.

Career
Deardorf first taught music at Western Washington University in 1978.  He then joined the faculty at the Cornish College of the Arts a year later as a professor of jazz and instrumental music.  He ultimately became the administrator of the school's jazz program, serving in that capacity from 1986 until 2000.

Outside of teaching, Deardorf continued to perform and record as a sideman for musicians such as Jovino Santos Neto, Bud Shank, Don Lanphere, Dave Peck, and Pete Christlieb.  He also played together with Dave Peterson, a local guitarist and composer, on a frequent basis starting in the late 1970s.  The duo eventually established the Deardorf Peterson Group in 2004.  They released Portal, their first album as co-bandleaders, that same year.  Deardorf also released two albums as leader – Transparence (2011) and Perception (2019).  He joked that he "play[ed] both kinds of music: country and western".

Personal life and death
Deardorf married Kelly Harland in 1987. She is a singer and author, and he had produced and featured on several of her albums. They remained married for 35 years until his death. Together, they had one son.

Deardorf suffered from hereditary kidney disease. To avoid dialysis, he underwent a kidney transplant from his brother in 2011. He died on October 9, 2022, aged 68, at the Virginia Mason Medical Center in Seattle. He had contracted COVID-19 two months before his death, leading to health complications.

Discography

As leader
 2004 Portal (co-leader with Dave Peterson as The Deardorf/Peterson Group)
 2011 Transparence
 2019 Perception

As sideman
With Don Lanphere
 1984 Don Loves Midge
 1986 Stop
 1988 Jay Clayton & Don Lanphere: TheJazz Alley Tapes
 1990 Don Lanphere & Larry Coryell
 1995 Go...Again
 1999 Year 'Round Christmas

With Bud Shank
 1990 Tales of the Pilot: Bud Shank Plays the Music of David Peck
 1986 Bud Shank Quartet at Jazz Alley (Contemporary)
 1992 The Awakening
 1995 Lost Cathedral

With Dave Peck
 1996 Solo
 1998 Trio
 1999 3 and 1

With  Jovino Santos Neto
 1997 Caboclo
 2000 Live in Olympia
 2003 Canto do Rio
 2011 Current

With Gunnar Bob Madsen
 1998 Power of a Hat
 1998 Spinning World: 13 Ways of Looking at a Waltz

With Jim Knapp
 1995 On Going Home
 1998 Things for Now

With others

 1989 Breaking Through, Phil Sheeran
 1990 Worth Waiting For, P.J. Perry
 1991 Living Things, Michael Tomlinson
 1991 Pacific Aire, Tom Collier
 1998 Collection, Mike Strickland
 1998 Photographs, Barney McClure
 1998 Red Kelley's Heroes, Pete Christlieb
 1999 Joy to the World, Gene Nery
 1999 The Face of Love, Eugene Maslov
 2002 Twelve Times Romance, Kelly Harland
 2003 Convergence Zone, Phil Kelly & the NW Prevailing Winds
 2003 Some Devil, Dave Matthews
 2005 Carolyn Graye, Carolyn Graye
 2006 Laid Back & Blues: Live at the Sky Church in Seattle, Larry Coryell
 2007 Malibu Manouche, Neil Andersson
 2007 Shade, Richie Cole
 2008 From the Depths, Karen Emerson
 2008 Long Ago and Far Away: Kelly Harland Sings Jerome Kern, Kelly Harland
 2008 Words & Music, Paul West
 2009 Across the Sound, Terry Lauber
 2009 Alone Together With the Blues, Mia Vermillion
 2010 As the Crow Flies, Neil Andersson/Malibu Manouche/Peter Pendras
 2010 Inner Mission, Randy Brecker/Richard Cole
 2010 Reunion, Hadley Caliman/Pete Christlieb
 2011 Imaginary Sketches, Chad McCullough/Bram Weijters
 2012 Double Exposure, Frank D'Rone

References

External links
 chuckdeardorf.com
 
 

1954 births
2022 deaths
Musicians from Dayton, Ohio
American jazz double-bassists
Male double-bassists
Western Washington University alumni
Cornish College of the Arts faculty
American jazz bass guitarists
American male bass guitarists
20th-century American bass guitarists
21st-century double-bassists
20th-century American male musicians
21st-century American male musicians
American male jazz musicians
Deaths from the COVID-19 pandemic in Washington (state)